Robert Wray may refer to:

 Robert O. Wray (born 1957), American businessman and author
 Robert B. Wray, 18th-century English printer